Eskelhems GoIF is a Swedish football club located in Visby on the island of Gotland.

Background
Eskelhems GoIF currently plays in Division 4 Gotland which is the sixth tier of Swedish football. They play their home matches at the Dalhem IP in Visby.

The club is affiliated to Gotlands Fotbollförbund. Eskelhem GoIF have competed in the Svenska Cupen on 2 occasions and have played 2 matches in the competition.

Season to season

References

External links
 Eskelhems GoIF – Official website
 Eskelhems GoIF on Facebook

Football clubs in Gotland County